Joseph Steven Sakic (born July 7, 1969) is a Canadian professional ice hockey executive and former player. He played his entire 21-year National Hockey League (NHL) career with the Quebec Nordiques/Colorado Avalanche franchise. Named captain of the team in 1992 (after serving as a co-captain in 1990–91), Sakic is regarded as one of the greatest team leaders in league history and was able to consistently motivate his team to play at a winning level. Nicknamed "Burnaby Joe", Sakic was named to play in 13 NHL All-Star Games and selected to the NHL First All-Star Team at centre three times. Sakic led the Avalanche to Stanley Cup titles in 1996 and 2001, being named the most valuable player of the 1996 playoffs, and honoured as the MVP of the NHL in 2001 by the hockey writers and his fellow players. He is one of six players to participate in the first two of the team's Stanley Cup victories, and won a third Stanley Cup with the Avalanche in 2022 while serving as the team's general manager. Sakic became only the third person, after Milt Schmidt and Serge Savard, to win a Stanley Cup with the same franchise as a player and general manager.

Over his career, Sakic was one of the most productive forwards in the game, scored 50 goals twice and earning at least 100 points in six different seasons. His wrist shot, considered one of the best in the NHL, was the source of much of his production as goalies around the league feared his rapid snap-shot release. At the conclusion of the 2008–09 NHL season, he was the eighth all-time points leader in the NHL, as well as 14th in all-time goals and 11th in all-time assists. During the 2002 Winter Olympics, Sakic helped lead Team Canada to its first ice hockey gold medal in 50 years, and was voted as the tournament's most valuable player. He represented the team in six other international competitions, including the 1998 and 2006 Winter Olympics.

Sakic retired from the NHL on July 9, 2009, and had his jersey number #19 retired prior to the Avalanche's 2009–10 season opener on October 1, 2009, at Pepsi Center. On November 12, 2012, Sakic was inducted into the Hockey Hall of Fame, along with Adam Oates, Pavel Bure and Mats Sundin. On April 11, 2013, Sakic and 11 others were inducted into the Canada Sports Hall of Fame. In 2017, Sakic was named one of the '100 Greatest NHL Players' in history.

Following the end of his playing career, Sakic continued with the Avalanche organization in a management capacity, first serving as executive advisor and alternate governor from 2011 to 2013. He was promoted to executive vice president of hockey operations on May 10, 2013, and named general manager the following year. After overseeing a team rebuild culminating in the franchise's third Stanley Cup victory in 2022, Sakic won the Jim Gregory General Manager of the Year Award. The team announced shortly thereafter that he was being promoted to president of hockey operations.

Early life
Sakic was born in Burnaby, British Columbia, to Marijan and Slavica Šakić  (originally Šakić), immigrants from Croatia. Growing up in Burnaby, he did not learn to speak English well until kindergarten, having been raised with Croatian as his mother tongue. At the age of four, Sakic attended his first NHL game, a match between the Vancouver Canucks and Atlanta Flames; after watching the game, Sakic decided that he wanted to become a hockey player. As a smaller player, he was forced to use skill rather than size to excel, and modelled himself after his idol, Wayne Gretzky. After showing exceptional promise as a young hockey player in Burnaby, Sakic was referenced as a new Wayne Gretzky in the making. He scored 83 goals and 156 points in 80 games for Burnaby while attending school at Burnaby North Secondary. Soon after, he was added to the Lethbridge Broncos of the Western Hockey League (WHL) for the last part of the 1985–86 season.

During the 1986–87 season, the Broncos relocated to Swift Current, Saskatchewan, becoming the Swift Current Broncos. Sakic, playing in his first full season, scored 60 goals and 73 assists for 133 points. These totals saw him named the Rookie of the Year of the WHL. But while Sakic enjoyed success on the ice, he and his team faced a tragedy on the night of December 30, 1986. The Broncos were driving to a game against the Regina Pats, and due to bad weather conditions, the bus crashed after the driver lost control on a patch of black ice outside of Swift Current. While Sakic was unharmed, four of his teammates (Trent Kresse, Scott Kruger, Chris Mantyka and Brent Ruff) were killed. This incident had a lasting impact on the young Sakic, who declined to talk about the crash throughout his career. The next year, in 1987–88, Sakic was named the WHL Most Valuable Player and Canadian Major Junior Player of the Year. He scored 160 points (78 goals, 82 assists), tying him with Theoren Fleury of the Moose Jaw Warriors for the WHL scoring title.

NHL career

Quebec Nordiques
Sakic was drafted 15th overall by the Quebec Nordiques in the 1987 NHL Entry Draft, a pick the Nordiques received when they traded away Dale Hunter and Clint Malarchuk to the Washington Capitals. Rather than make the immediate jump, he told the Nordiques management he would prefer to spend the 1987–88 season in Swift Current to prepare for the NHL. He made his NHL debut on October 6, 1988, against the Hartford Whalers and registered an assist. His first NHL goal came two days later against goaltender Sean Burke of the New Jersey Devils. During the season, he wore #88 because his preferred number, #19 was already taken by a teammate, Alain Côté. While considered a front-runner for the Calder Memorial Trophy as rookie of the year due to his rapid scoring pace, an ankle injury that forced him to miss 10 games in December and the resulting scoring slump helped quash any hopes of winning the award. He would finish his rookie season with 62 points in 70 games, and finishing eighth in voting for the Calder; defenceman Brian Leetch, who won the rookie scoring race with 28 goals and 48 assists, won with forty-two first-place votes, while Sakic only received two third-place votes.

In 1989–90, his second NHL season, Sakic was able to switch his number back to his familiar #19 (Alain Côté had retired over the summer), and scored 102 points, which was ninth overall in the league, becoming the first player in NHL history to score 100 points on a last place team. At the start of the next season, 1990–91, he was named co-captain along with Steven Finn (Sakic was captain for home games, Finn for away games) and again passed the 100 point mark, improving to 109 points and sixth overall in the league, but would slip during 1991–92 to 94 points, having missed 11 games. Early on in the season, Sakic showed some of his leadership qualities, even while Mike Hough was serving as captain, as he stood firm in the Eric Lindros holdout issue. With Lindros holding out against the Nordiques, who were one of the worst teams in league, Sakic commented, "We only want players here who have the passion to play the game. I'm tired of hearing that name. He's not here and there are a lot of others in this locker room who really care about the game." Lindros was traded a year later, ending the situation and bringing in a number of quality players, which vastly improved the Nordiques. During their first four seasons with Joe Sakic, the Nordiques finished last place in the Adams Division and last in the entire league for three straight years, from 1989 to 1991.

Starting with the 1992–93 season, Sakic became the sole captain of the franchise. Under his leadership, the Nordiques made the playoffs for the first time in six years and set a franchise record for wins and points in the process (since broken by the 2000–01 Colorado Avalanche team). Sakic reached the 100-point plateau, the third time he did so in five years, by scoring 48 goals and 105 points in the regular season, and added another six points in the playoffs. In the shortened 1994–95, after the 1994–95 NHL lock-out, Sakic was eight points behind Jaromír Jágr for the scoring title with a fourth-place finish, and helped the Nordiques win the division title, their first since the 1985–86 season.

Colorado Avalanche
In May 1995, the Nordiques announced that the team had been sold and were relocating from Quebec. Before the start of the 1995–96 season, the franchise moved to Denver, Colorado, and was renamed the Colorado Avalanche. Sakic led the team to a Stanley Cup championship in its first year, scoring 120 points in 82 regular-season games and 34 points in 22 playoff games. He was awarded the Conn Smythe Trophy as the most valuable player of the 1996 NHL playoffs. During the run for the Cup, Sakic again proved himself to be an effective team leader. Although his Nordiques had missed the playoffs in five of his first seven years in the NHL, he scored 18 goals, including six game-winners, and 34 points. He was one goal off from the record for goals in a playoff year, and his game-winning goals established a new record.

In the 1996–97 season, Sakic only played in 65 games due to a lacerated calf, yet still managed to score 74 points as the Avalanche earned their first Presidents' Trophy and third straight division title. He had another great playoff season with eight goals and 17 assists, and took the Avalanche all the way to the conference finals, where they eventually lost to the Detroit Red Wings in six games. As a free agent during the summer of 1997, Sakic signed a three-year, $21 million offer sheet with the New York Rangers as a restricted free agent. Under the collective bargaining agreement at the time, the Avalanche had one week to match the Rangers' offer or let go of Sakic in exchange for five first-round draft picks as compensation. While it seemed as if the Avs could not afford to keep Sakic as they had already committed large amounts of salary to Peter Forsberg and Patrick Roy, an unlikely lifeline would appear in the form of the movie Air Force One, produced by Avalanche owners COMSAT and a blockbuster hit that summer. Its profits enabled Colorado to match the offer, which instigated a salary raise for many NHL players.

Injuries would again limit Sakic's playing time in the 1997–98 season. While playing in his first Olympics with Team Canada, Sakic hurt his knee and was forced to miss 18 games with the Avalanche. In the 64 games he did play in, he still scored 63 points, enough to earn him his seventh All-Star appearance. He finally rebounded from his injury problems in the 1998–99 season, finishing fifth in the league in scoring with 41 goals and 96 points in only 73 games. He led the Avalanche all the way to within one game of the Stanley Cup Finals, where they lost to the eventual champion Dallas Stars. After the season ended, Sakic was ranked number 94 on The Hockey News''' list of the 100 Greatest Hockey Players.

During the 1999–2000 season, Sakic reached several career milestones. Injuries limited him to only 60 games, but he still managed to lead the team in scoring with 81 points. On December 27, 1999, against the St. Louis Blues, Sakic earned an assist to become the 56th player in NHL history to reach 1,000 career points. Later in the season, on March 23, 2000, he scored a hat trick against the Phoenix Coyotes, and became the 59th player to score 400 career goals. It also gave him 1,049 points with the Quebec/Colorado franchise, passing Peter Šťastný as the all-time leader on the team.

Sakic eclipsed the 100 point mark again in 2000–01, finishing with 118 along with a career-best 54 goals, both being second-best in the league. He won the Hart Memorial Trophy, the Lady Byng Memorial Trophy and the Lester B. Pearson Award (the latter presented to him by former Nordiques mentor Peter Šťastný), while also being a finalist for the Frank J. Selke Trophy. He led the Avalanche to their second Stanley Cup championship, defeating the defending title holders New Jersey Devils in seven games. Memorably, after receiving the Cup from the NHL commissioner, Sakic broke with tradition by not hoisting it first as most captains do, instead passing the Cup straight to Ray Bourque, a player who had waited a record-breaking 22 seasons to win the Stanley Cup.

Sakic led the Avalanche in scoring again in the 2001–02 season, finishing sixth in the league with 79 points. On March 9, 2002, he played in his 1,000th career game. The Avalanche once again reached the Western Conference Finals, but lost to the eventual Cup-winning Detroit Red Wings. The following year, Sakic appeared in only 58 games and finished with just 58 points. He rebounded the following year, finishing third in the league with 87 points. It also marked the first time since the 1993–94 season that his team did not win the division title, which was won by the Vancouver Canucks.

Following the 2004–05 NHL lock-out, the Avalanche were forced to lose many of their key players in order to stay below the salary cap. Even with the loss of teammates Peter Forsberg and Adam Foote, Sakic still helped the Avalanche get into the playoffs, where they eventually lost to the Anaheim Ducks in the conference semi-finals. In June 2006, Sakic signed a one-year, $5.75 million deal to keep him with the Avalanche for the 2006–07 season. Upon the retirement of Steve Yzerman a month later, on July 3, 2006, Sakic became the League leader for most NHL career points scored among active players.

Sakic had another strong season in the 2006–07. He scored his 600th career goal on February 15, 2007, against the Calgary Flames, becoming the 17th player in history to reach the milestone and third that year. On the final day of the regular season, he scored his 100th point, reaching the milestone for the sixth time in his career. At the same time, Sakic became the second-oldest NHL player to score 100 points in a season at age 37, alongside hockey legend Gordie Howe. Despite his efforts as well as a late-season charge, Sakic and the Avalanche missed the playoffs for the first time in 11 years, finishing one point behind the eighth placed Calgary Flames. On May 1, the NHL announced that Sakic was named as one of the three finalists of the Lady Byng Trophy, but it was eventually awarded to Pavel Datsyuk of the Detroit Red Wings.

In April 2007, Sakic signed on for a 19th NHL season with the Colorado Avalanche, signing a one-year deal for 2007–08. Sakic commented on the deal, saying "at this stage in my career, I prefer to do one-year deals as I evaluate my play year-to-year." Upon signing Sakic to the deal, Avalanche General Manager François Giguère said, "Joe is the heart of this organization and his leadership and value to this team and especially our young players is unquestioned." On October 7, 2007, he scored a goal and had an assist against the San Jose Sharks, moving past Phil Esposito into eighth place on the NHL career points list with 1,591. Nineteen days later, Sakic scored a goal and assisted Ryan Smyth for an overtime game-winning goal against the Calgary Flames, reaching his 1,600th point in the NHL. On December 27, 2007, it was announced that Sakic underwent hernia surgery to accelerate the recovery of an injury that had forced him to miss the previous 12 games after a 232 consecutive games played streak. The operation caused him to miss a career-high 38 games. He was activated off of the injured reserve on February 24 and played that night, scoring an assist. On March 22, 2008, Sakic recorded his 1,000th career assist against the Edmonton Oilers, becoming the 11th player in NHL history to reach this milestone.

In June 2008, Sakic had a talk with Colorado General Manager François Giguère and said that he is uncertain with his future with the Avalanche. However, it was announced on August 27, 2008, that Sakic decided to sign a one-year contract with the team. Injuries limited Sakic's playing time in 2008–09. A herniated disk in his back forced him to stop playing in early November, after playing in 15 games, in which Sakic scored 12 points. While at home letting his back heal, Sakic broke three fingers in a snow-blower accident. He announced his retirement on July 9, 2009 The Avalanche retired his jersey, #19, prior to their 2009–10 season opener on October 1, 2009, with a "C" on the banner to represent his lengthy service as team captain (having been the only captain of the Avalanche until he retired). Sakic was also named the inaugural member of the Avalanche Alumni Association.

All-Star Games
Sakic was voted into the NHL All-Star Game 13 times and played in 12 of them, serving as a captain for two of them, the last in 2007. He had at least one point in 11 of them. The only one that he missed entirely was the 1997 All-Star Game, due to an injury. Sakic won the Most Valuable Player award in the 2004 All-Star Game after scoring a hat trick, despite the Western Conference losing the game. He is the all-time assist leader in All-Star Games with 16 assists and is third place in all-time all-star scoring with 22 points, behind Mario Lemieux (23 points) and Wayne Gretzky (25 points). His best record in an All-Star Game was in 2007, when he scored four assists for the winning team; however the MVP award was given to Daniel Brière, who had a goal and four assists.

International play

Sakic had an extensive international hockey career, representing Canada at seven international competitions. After being drafted by the Nordiques in 1987, he went on and helped Canada win the 1988 World Junior Championship. His next tournament was the 1991 World Championships, where Canada won the silver medal and Sakic contributed eleven points in ten games. He tried out for the 1991 Canada Cup Canadian team, but was the first player to be cut, being cited for his weak leg strength. Sakic was bitter about the experience, feeling he was not given a good enough chance to prove himself, and called the whole experience "a complete waste of time."

Sakic's first successful professional tournament was the 1994 World Championships, where Canada won its first gold medal in the tournament since 1961. Sakic's seven points in eight games were a crucial part of the team's success. During the 1996 World Cup of Hockey, he played only a minor role in Canada's second-place finish as he scored one goal and two assists in six games. However, the tournament allowed him to showcase that he was indeed a dominant player who had simply been overlooked.

Sakic's first Olympic appearance came in 1998 at Nagano, Japan, the first tournament in which NHL players participated. Bothered by a knee injury, he only scored three points in four games, as the Canadian squad failed to meet expectations and finished in fourth. His second Olympic appearance came in 2002 in Salt Lake City; led by his strong play, the Canadian team reached the gold medal match against Team USA, in which Sakic scored four points and helped Canada win its first gold medal in 50 years. He was later named MVP of the tournament with a cumulative tally of four goals and six assists and became one of the first Canadian members of the Triple Gold Club. Sakic also played a part in Canada's triumph in the 2004 World Cup of Hockey, where he scored six points in six games.

On December 21, 2005, Sakic was named captain of Team Canada for the 2006 Winter Olympics in Turin, Italy. Once again, Team Canada was heavily favoured and given high expectations, but they failed to medal, finishing seventh overall. Sakic finished the tournament with three points.

Executive career
After he retired, Sakic decided to take time off from hockey and spent time with his family. In 2011, two years after his retirement, Sakic returned to the Avalanche to work in their front office. He was named an executive advisor and alternate governor for the team, effective at the end of the 2010–11 season. In his role as an advisor, Sakic would advise the team in hockey-related matters, and as an alternate governor, would represent the team at Board of Governors meetings.

On June 26, 2012, Sakic was selected to the Hockey Hall of Fame in his first year of eligibility. He was inducted into the Hockey Hall of Fame on November 12, 2012, along with Mats Sundin, Pavel Bure and Adam Oates. Sakic was the only member of his class who won the Stanley Cup during his career.

On May 10, 2013, the Avalanche promoted Sakic to executive vice president of hockey operations. In this expanded role, Sakic had the final say on all matters regarding hockey personnel. During Patrick Roy's time as head coach, they shared most of the duties normally held by a general manager. General Manager Greg Sherman remained in his post, but served mainly in an advisory role to Roy and Sakic. This de facto arrangement was formalized the following season, when Sakic was formally named general manager and Sherman was demoted to assistant general manager.

Sakic's tenure as general manager faced early adversity, notably in the 2016–17 season where the team finished in last place and managed only 48 points in the standings. He admitted later that he was at points expecting to be sacked by the team ownership in the midst of the poor results. Despite finishing last, the team did not win any of the top three lottery picks in the 2017 NHL Entry Draft, dropping to fourth. This seeming misfortune would later prove beneficial, as it led to the Avalanche selecting future Norris Trophy-winning defenceman Cale Makar at fourth overall. The poor season also initiated a trade request from star player Matt Duchene that Sakic would ultimately parlay into several assets, including defencemen Sam Girard and Bowen Byram. In later years he would make additional trades for Nazem Kadri, Devon Toews, and Artturi Lehkonen, and sign Valeri Nichushkin as a free agent. The Avalanche won the Presidents' Trophy for the 2020–21 season, but faltered in the second round of the playoffs for the third consecutive season. They finished second in the regular season the following year, but won the Stanley Cup. Sakic became only the third person, after Milt Schmidt and Serge Savard, to win a Stanley Cup with the same franchise as a player and general manager. In recognition of his work for the 2021–22 season, Sakic received the Jim Gregory General Manager of the Year Award afterward.

On July 11, 2022, the Avalanche announced that Sakic would be ceding the general manager title to longtime assistant Chris MacFarland and assuming a new role as president of hockey operations.

Personal life
Sakic and his wife Debbie have three children: son Mitchell, born in 1996, and fraternal twins, son Chase and daughter Kamryn, born in October 2000. They met at a local high school while he was playing in Swift Current, and they frequently return to the town during the off-season. Sakic is an avid golfer, and competed in the celebrity Pro Am golf tournament in Lake Tahoe in the summer of 2006. Each summer during his playing career, he also hosted his own charity golf tournament which benefited the Food Bank of the Rockies. His charity work, was estimated to have provided more than seven million meals to poor children and families, and earned him an NHL Foundation Player Award in 2007.

Sakic was a fan favourite in his hometown of Burnaby, where a street has been named Joe Sakic Way in his honour. Throughout British Columbia, he is known as "Burnaby Joe"; in Colorado, he is known as "Super Joe." His younger brother Brian joined the Swift Current Broncos during Joe's final season with the team, and later played for the Flint Generals of the United Hockey League. Sakic also has an uncredited role in the movie Happy Gilmore as a "player at hockey tryouts".

Career statistics

Regular season and playoffs

International

All-Star games

Legacy

Milestones
Sakic recorded his 1,000th career point on December 27, 1999, against the St. Louis Blues. He became the 11th player to reach 1,500 points, doing so on October 25, 2006, with an assist against the Washington Capitals, and the sixth to do so with one franchise. Gordie Howe, Wayne Gretzky, Mario Lemieux, Ray Bourque, and Steve Yzerman are the others who achieved this feat.

Sakic played his 1,000th career game on March 9, 2002, against the Los Angeles Kings. His 500th career goal came against the Vancouver Canucks on December 11, 2002. In a February 15, 2007, game against the Calgary Flames, Sakic scored his 600th career goal. He also earned his 900th assist, the 16th player to do so, against the Flames in a game on March 12, 2006.

During the final game of the 2006–07 season, Sakic scored his 100th point of the year. This made him, at age 37, the second oldest player in NHL history, after Gordie Howe, to record 100 points in a regular season. He became the longest active tenured captain in the league, with fifteen seasons leading the Nordiques/Avalanche franchise, after the retirement of Steve Yzerman at the conclusion of the 2005–06 regular season. On March 22, 2008, against the Edmonton Oilers, Sakic recorded the 1,000th assist of his career, the 11th player to do so. The gloves he wore in the game were later sent to the Hockey Hall of Fame.

Alongside Bobby Clarke, Wayne Gretzky, and Mark Messier, Sakic is one of four players to captain his team to a Stanley Cup championship and win the Hart Memorial Trophy in the same year. Sakic is also a member of the Triple Gold Club, a term used in ice hockey to describe players who have won an Olympic gold medal, a World Championship gold medal and the Stanley Cup.

Records
In his 20-year career with the Nordiques and Avalanche, Sakic has obtained nearly all of the franchise scoring records, including most all-time goals (625), assists (1,016) and points (1,641). He also holds the franchise record for most games played (1,363), and is on several notable NHL records which are most All-Star game assists (16) and most playoff overtime goals (8).

Leadership

Throughout his career, Sakic was one of the top scorers in the league, but in his early years, he was criticized for not leading his team to playoff success. While in Quebec, the Nordiques were one of the worst teams in the league, finishing last in their division five out of the seven years Sakic was with the team, including three straight years of being last overall in the league. After leading the Avalanche to the Stanley Cup in 1996 with his 34 playoff points, Sakic began to be seen as capable of leading a team to success, and he was seen as one of the league's premier players.

Though Sakic was a quiet individual, he was able to motivate his team to play at higher levels, which earned him the respect of his peers and executives. The first signs of Sakic's leadership began to show while still a member of the Swift Current Broncos of the WHL. After the bus crash that killed four of his teammates, Sakic was seen as the leader of the team, acknowledging that the experience changed his outlook on life. Early in his career with the Nordiques (when Mike Hough was still captain), with the team hoping to rebuild around their top draft pick Eric Lindros, and holding onto Lindros' rights for the season when he refused to sign, Sakic suggested that the team could progress without Lindros, saying, "We only want players here who have the passion to play the game. I'm tired of hearing that name. He's not here and there are a lot of others in this locker room who really care about the game." Lindros was traded a year later, bringing in a number of quality players, which vastly improved the Nordiques. Sakic's leadership qualities led him to be courted by other teams, such as in the summer of 1997, when the New York Rangers offered him a large contract in order to replace departed captain Mark Messier, though the Avalanche ultimately matched the offer and retained Sakic.

One of the most defining actions of Sakic's career was at the conclusion of the 2001 playoffs. Defying the NHL tradition of the captain being the first to skate around with the Stanley Cup, Sakic passed it off to teammate Ray Bourque. Bourque, one of the best defensemen to ever play, had been traded to the Avalanche the year before after spending 21 years with the Boston Bruins and setting the record for most games played without winning the Cup. Sakic's handing of the Stanley Cup exemplified his classiness and how he performed through actions rather than words.

When an eye injury forced Steve Yzerman (who normally wore number 19 for Canada) to miss the 2004 World Cup of Hockey, Sakic and Joe Thornton both refused the number out of respect for their injured countryman, even though both players each wore the number 19 for their respective NHL clubs and who were now eligible to wear it for Team Canada in Yzerman's absence.

Sakic's leadership qualities and abilities helped carry the Avalanche in the years after their 2001 Stanley Cup, which saw the team lose key players to retirement and free agency, especially after the 2004–05 lock-out.

Awards

WHL and CHL

NHL

InternationalAll awards taken from NHL.com ''

Other
 In October 2022, he was inaugurated in the Croatian-American Sports Hall of Fame.

See also
 List of NHL statistical leaders
 List of NHL players with 1000 points
 List of NHL players with 500 goals

References

External links

 
 
 
 
 

1969 births
Living people
Canadian expatriate ice hockey players in the United States
Canadian ice hockey centres
Canadian people of Croatian descent
Colorado Avalanche executives
Colorado Avalanche players
Conn Smythe Trophy winners
Hart Memorial Trophy winners
Hockey Hall of Fame inductees
Ice hockey people from British Columbia
Ice hockey players at the 1998 Winter Olympics
Ice hockey players at the 2002 Winter Olympics
Ice hockey players at the 2006 Winter Olympics
IIHF Hall of Fame inductees
Lady Byng Memorial Trophy winners
Lester B. Pearson Award winners
Lethbridge Broncos players
Medalists at the 2002 Winter Olympics
National Hockey League All-Stars
National Hockey League first-round draft picks
National Hockey League general managers
National Hockey League players with retired numbers
Olympic gold medalists for Canada
Olympic ice hockey players of Canada
Olympic medalists in ice hockey
Quebec Nordiques draft picks
Quebec Nordiques players
Sportspeople from Burnaby
Stanley Cup champions
Swift Current Broncos players
Triple Gold Club